Eyes of Youth is a 1919 American silent drama film directed by Albert Parker and starring Clara Kimball Young.  The film was based on the stage play Eyes of Youth, performed on Broadway in 1917-18 and starred Marjorie Rambeau. This film also features Rudolph Valentino in a role as a thief/con artist.

This film is often credited as the vehicle that led Valentino to be cast in The Four Horseman of the Apocalypse (1921).

Cast
 Clara Kimball Young - Gina Ashling
 Gareth Hughes - Kenneth Ashling
 Pauline Starke - Rita Ashling
 Sam Southern - Mr. Ashling
 Edmund Lowe - Peter Judson
 Ralph Lewis - Robert Goring
 Milton Sills - Louis Anthony
 Vincent Serrano - The Yogi
 William Courtleigh - Paolo Salvo
 Norman Selby - Dick Brownell (billed as "Kid McCoy")
 Rudolph Valentino - Clarence Morgan (billed as "Rudolfo Valentino")
 Claire Windsor - Guest at party (uncredited)

Remake
The story was remade as The Love of Sunya (1927) starring Gloria Swanson and with Albert Parker once again directing.

Home media
On April 17, 2012, Eyes of Youth was released on Region 1 DVD by Alpha Home Entertainment

References

External links

 
 Eyes of Youth at SilentEra
Eyes of Youth page via Clara Kimball Young entry at Unsung Divas website
 
 

1919 films
1919 drama films
Silent American drama films
American silent feature films
American black-and-white films
American films based on plays
Films directed by Albert Parker
Films shot in Los Angeles
Films shot in San Francisco
American independent films
Articles containing video clips
1910s independent films
1910s American films